Chandeshwor Jha (born 1953) is a Nepali politician from Mohattori. He is a permanent resident of Jaleshwor Municipality Ward 7.  

In the 2013 Constituent Assembly election he was elected from the Mohattori-4 constituency as an independent candidate. He was also unanimously elected as the chairman of the development committee of the local campus Jaleshwor, Mohattori. 

Jha proposed the utilization of Rs 5 million, provided by the Local Development Ministry for the construction of a 900-metre road in his village. The villagers had unanimously elected him the Chairman of the road consumer committee. He was also the member of 49-member panel formed to draft CA regulations. The committee had to form other necessary sub committees to carry out jobs related to constitution drafting, management of CA meetings and drafting regulations and policies required to perform other works in line with Article 78 of the Interim Constitution-2007. 

Jha joined the madhesi movement with other madhesi political parties for equal rights for the Madhesi people. He joined the Rastriya Janata Party Nepal on 1 September 2017.

References

1959 births
Living people
People from Mahottari District
Members of the 2nd Nepalese Constituent Assembly